Albert W. Hale (January 1, 1882 – February 27, 1947) was a French-born American early film director and producer. He directed some 35 films from 1912 until 1915. He worked for Majestic Studio, and the National Film Corporation.

Background
Hale was born in Bordeaux, France on January 1, 1882.

He married Julia F. Johnson.

Filmography
The Birth of the Lotus Blossom (1912)
For the Mikado (1912)
Miss Taqu of Tokio, also called Miss Tagu of Tokio for the British release, (1912) with Tokuko Takagi, a Thanhouser film
Letters of a Lifetime (1912)
The Light of St. Bernard (1912)
Three Girls and a Man (1912)
Roland's Escapades
Days of Terror (1912)
Three Girls and a Man (1912)
She Cried (film) (1912)
The Irony of Fate (film) (1912)
A Fortune in a Teacup
A Persistent Lover (1912)
Her Old Sweetheart (1912)
Roland's Lucky Day
Buried Alive in a Coal Mine (1913)
An Accidental Clue (1913)
The Iceman's Revenge (1913)
A Tide in the Affairs of Men (1913)
The Mystery of Tusa (1913) starring J. Warren Kerrigan
Tom Blake's Redemption (1913)
At the Half-Breed's Mercy (1913)
Quicksands (1913 Kerrigan film) (1913), starring J. Warren Kerrigan
Calamity Anne Takes a Trip (1913)
A Husband's Mistake (1913)
Reward of Courage (1913)
Buried Alive in a Coal Mine (1913)
The No Account Count (1914), Kalem
Tough Luck Smith (1914)
Fatty and the Shyster Lawyer (1914)
The Widow's Might (1914 film) (1914)
A Wise Rube (1914)
Tough Luck Smith (1914)
Percy Pimpernickel, Soubrette (1914), a Kalem film
For the Love of Mike (1914 film) (1914)
Jones' Wedding Day (1914)
Easy Money (1914 film) (1914) from a story by Frank Howard Clark
The Winking Zulu (1914)
Was She a Vampire? (1915)

Producer
The Prisoner of Zenda (1913 film)

References

American film directors
American film producers
1882 births
1947 deaths
Mass media people from Bordeaux
French emigrants to the United States